The Oxford Diocesan Guild of Church Bell Ringers is a society representing the rings and bell-ringers of the Diocese of Oxford who practice the art of change ringing. They cover the counties of Oxfordshire, Buckinghamshire and Berkshire and was established on 17 January 1881 at Reading.

The Guild is split into 15 branches;
Banbury Branch
Bicester Branch
Central Bucks Branch, covering Aylesbury and Winslow area
Chiltern Branch, covering Wendover area
Chipping Norton Branch
East Berks and South Bucks Branch, covering the High Wycombe, Amersham and Windsor area
Newbury Branch
North Bucks Branch, covering Buckingham, Milton Keynes, Olney and Bletchley area
Old North Berks Branch, covering Abingdon, Wallingford and Appleton area
Oxford City Branch
Reading Branch
Sonning Deanery Branch, covering Sonning and Wokingham area
South Oxon Branch, covering Dorchester on Thames and Thame area
Vale of the White Horse Branch, in the Shrivenham and Faringdon area
Witney and Woodstock Branch

Affiliation
The Guild is affiliated to the Central Council of Church Bell Ringers (CCCBR), a global organisation representing all those who practice Change ringing, and currently sends five representatives to be part of the Council.

External links
Guild web-site
Bicester branch
Newbury branch
North Bucks branch
South Oxon branch

References

Bell ringing societies in England
Diocese of Oxford